Coleophora cinerea is a moth of the family Coleophoridae. It is found in France and Italy.

References

cinerea
Moths described in 1953
Moths of Europe